Kinnea (Irish: Ceann Eich) a townland in the Urris Valley, located in the North-West corner of the Inishowen Peninsula.

It is in the Electoral Division of Dunaff, in Civil Parish of Clonmany, in the Barony of Inishowen East, in County Donegal.  It borders the following other townlands: Dunaff to the west; Letter to the south; Straid to the south and Tullagh to the east.  It has four subtownlands; Rockstown (Irish: Baile na Creige), Altnacullentra, Kindrohid (Irish: Ceann Droichid)  and Crocknagee (Irish: Croc na gaoithe).

Kinnea has an area of 227.53 hectares (562.23 acres).

Etymology 
The name Kinnea is an anglicization of Ceann Eich, meaning Horse's Head. The area is commonly known as Rockstown.  This name was introduced in the 17th century by English settlers, which supplanted the much older Gaelic name of Kinnea.

History 
The townland is not mentioned in the Civil Survey - a cadastral survey of landholdings in Ireland carried out in 1654–56, nor in the Down Survey of 1655.  The townland is mapped in William Mc Crea's "A Map of County Donegal" published in 1801. It is also referenced in the Griffiths Valuation of the 1850s.  The townland is also mentioned in the Irish Census' of 1901 and 1911. In the 1860s, Rockstown is recorded as having a harbour.

Kinnea is mentioned the 1814 Statistical Account (Parochial Survey of Ireland).  The Survey described the land ownership:"A part of the lands of this Parish (Clonmany) belongs to the Bishop of Derry, and the remainder was the fee-simple estate of the Marquis of Donegal until the year 1810, when the townlands of Tullagh, Kinnea, Letter, Dunaff, and Urrismana, Leenan...were sold...to Sir Robert Harvey."The Survey also indicated that Arthur Chichester, MP owned a small villa in Roxtown (Kinnea).

During the 19th century, there was a coast-guard station in Kindrohid. It is marked on the maps used in the Griffiths Valuation.

Great Famine 
Between 1845 and 1852, Ireland suffered a catastrophic famine due to a potato blight, which destroyed the primary source of food for the poorest sections of society.  There are no direct records of the death toll in Kinnea.  A comparison of the 1841 and 1851 census indicates that the population fell from 241 to 205; a decline of 14.5 percent.  While it is not possible to attribute that decline to famine-related deaths or to immigration, the number of inhabited houses remained constant during that period, suggesting that the primary cause of the population decline was immigration.  Kinnea's proximity to the sea offered alternative food sources which helped limit the population's dependence on potatoes.

Shipwreck 
A three masted ship ran around in Rockstown bay in October 1860.  The crew abandoned the ship before it broke up.

Rural unrest in the late 19th century 
Land ownership in Kinnea and the surrounding valley of Urris was highly contentious, with landlords often issuing eviction notices to tenant farmers.  These evictions often led to violent confrontations between the bailiffs and local residents.

Evictions of tenants in rent arrears was a relatively frequent occurrence, and efforts to remove people from their homes was met by protest. In January 1881, four local men, named Bernard Toland. Patrick McCanny, Owen Doherty, and Denis McCool, were charged with having engaged in a riot and unlawful assembly.  They were also accused of assaulting Thomas Stuart, a Bailiff who had visited Kinnea to serve eviction notices.  A crowd of 150 residents confronted Stuart and pelted him with snowballs and sods of turf.  The police, who had accompanied Stuart, identified the four men from the assembled crowd.  The magistrates took a lenient view of the incident and dismissed the case.

Beached Whale 
In September 1931, a large whale was beached in Rockstown Bay.  The whale was sighted for several days, vainly attempting to escape the shallows.  Eventually it landed ashore and despite the efforts of local people, the whale died.  The whale attracted large crowds from as far away as Londonderry.

Second World War 
In October 1940, a crate containing a bomber plane came ashore in a crate in Rockstown Bay.  Three local men, Philip Diver, from Letter, John Devlin from Rockstown and John O'Donnell, from Rockstown found the crate, dismantled parts of the plane and used the wood and other items for construction materials.  They were later arrested and charged under the Merchant Shipping Act of 1894.  They were subsequently found guilty and fined at Carndonagh Court.

Binion Head Fishing Disaster 
On Friday, 17 August 1962, three fishermen from Rockstown drowned when their lobster boat hit submerged rocks and sank in calm seas off Binion Head.  The three men were Patrick Doherty (aged 40), John McGilloway (aged 50) and his son, also called John McGilloway (aged 24).  Patrick Doherty left behind a wife and five children ranging in age from ten to four years.  A fourth man, John Devlin, the brother-in-law of John McGilloway, normally joined the fishing crew, but chose to stay at home on the day of the disaster.

The men went off fishing as usual at 9a.m. and were expected to be back by early evening. Their boat was observed passing Binion at about 11am. When the men failed to arrive by late evening the alarm was raised. At around 8:30pm, the local parish priest, Fr. James O'Conner organised a search party.  He telephoned the Malin Head wireless station.  A lifeboat from Portrush was called to assist and arrived in the area at 4am the following morning.  Later the shattered wreckage of part of the 25-foot boat washed ashore on Ballyliffin Strand, a few hundred yards from Binion Head. The search party also found three full tea flasks, indicating that tragedy struck before the men had their lunch. Over the next two days, wreckage from the boat washed ashore from Pollan beach to Binion, a distance of more than a mile.

Through Saturday and Sunday the search continued. Frogmen came to help from a Londonderry-based British naval unit. An RAF helicopter also joined the search effort. On Monday, frogmen from the "Sea Eagle" Royal Navy Unit found the bodies of John McGilloway Senior and his Son.  The keel of the boat with timber from the bow was beside the bodies.  A week later, the body of Patrick Doherty was recovered.

The following Tuesday Royal Navy frogmen conducted another search where the bodies of John McGilloway and his son were found.  The divers located the boat's engine on the seabed off Rockstown Harbor.  A rope was entangled in the propeller, which according to the coroner "fouled the engine, causing the boat to drift and strike submerged rocks". The frogmen suggested that the rope was attached to a buoy from missing lobster pots.  However, pieces of the wreckage were blackened which gave rise to an alternative theory that the boat was destroyed by an explosion on board.

A relief fund was later established to support the families of the lost men.

Places of interest 

 Rockstown Bay - Situated between Dunaff Head and Tullagh point, the Bay has a large pebble beach.  On the easterly side of the bay there is an attractive sandy beach.
Rockstown House - Built in the early 19th century.  It was a summer home to the Chichester family.
The Wild Atlantic Way -  A small section of this tourism trail bisects through Kinnea, largely tracing the banks of Rockstown Bay.
Raghtin Beg  - A mountain with an elevation of 1,358 ft.

References 

Townlands of County Donegal